Aleksander Zarzycki (26 February 1834 in Lwów (Lemberg), Austria-Hungary (now Lviv, Ukraine) – 1 November 1895 in Warsaw) was a Polish pianist, composer and conductor. Author of piano and violin compositions, mazurkas, polonaises, krakowiaks, and songs.

In 1871 he co-founded and became the first director of the Warsaw Music Society (Warszawskie Towarzystwo Muzyczne). In the years 1879–1888 director of the Warsaw Music Institute (Insytut Muzyczny w Warszawie).

Selected works
Orchestral
 Suite polonaise (Suita polska), Op. 37
   À la polonaise (Tempo di polacca)
   À la mazourka
   Intermezzo cantabile
   À la cracovienne

Concertante
 Grande polonaise for piano and orchestra, Op. 7
 Concerto (Koncert fortepianowy) for piano and orchestra, Op. 17
 Andante et polonaise (Andante i polonez A-dur) in A major for violin and orchestra (or piano), Op. 23
 Introduction et cracovienne (Introduction and Krakowiak; Introdukcja i Krakowiak D-dur) in D major for violin and orchestra, Op. 35

Chamber music
 Romance (Romans) for violin and piano or small ensemble accompaniment (flute, clarinet, 2 horns and strings), Op. 16 (published 1876) 
 Mazurka in G major for violin and piano or orchestra, Op. 26 (published 1884)
 Mazurka No. 2 (II. Mazurek E-dur) in E major for violin and piano, Op. 39

Piano
 Valse brillante (1866)
 Grande valse, Op. 4 (published 1862)
 2 Chants sans paroles, Op. 6
   Berceuse
   Idylle
 2 Nocturnes (G major, A major), Op. 10 (published 1868)
 2 Mazurkas, Op. 12 (published in 1869)
 Chant d'amour et Barcarolle, 2 Morceaux, Op. 19
 Sérénade et Valse-Impromptu, 2 Morceaux, Op. 24
 Mazurka in E, Op.38 (published 1894)

Vocal
 "Między nami nic nie było"
 3 Lieder, Op. 11 (published 1868)
 3 Songs for soprano and piano, Op. 22

References

External links
 
 Scores by Aleksander Zarzycki in digital library Polona

1834 births
1895 deaths
Musicians from Lviv
Polish classical composers
Polish conductors (music)
Male conductors (music)
Polish classical pianists
Male classical pianists
Academic staff of the Chopin University of Music
Polish male classical composers
19th-century classical composers
19th-century conductors (music)
19th-century classical pianists